Marukin Ramen is a Tokyo-based chain of ramen restaurants.

In 2016, the company's first location in the United States opened in Portland, Oregon. A second location opened in Portland. The two restaurants separated from Marukin and became known as Kinboshi Ramen in 2021.

See also
 List of Japanese restaurants

References

Defunct Asian restaurants in Portland, Oregon
Japanese restaurants in Portland, Oregon
Ramen shops
Restaurant chains
Restaurants in Japan